Echoes and Signals (aka Echoes&Signals) is a musical project by Russian songwriter, guitarist, vocalist and record producer Fedor Kivokurtsev. The project's title refers to the 'unity of opposites' concept, which is the central category of many philosophical discourses

History 

The project begins its story in 2012 as an instrumental act drawing inspiration from progressive rock and post/math rock genres. After releasing 2 conceptual EPs "Comma" and "Ouroboros" the first long play album called "V" (reference to the five stages of grief) has been released in 2014.

The second LP "Monodrama" was released in 2017. Album title and concept were referring to psychotherapy method. Musically "Monodrama" was featuring instrumental progressive rock combined with guest vocals by Mariana Semkina in the song Lead Astray.

During live tours and performances EaS shared a stage with Pain of Salvation, Long Distance Calling, Sólstafir.

The third long play album "Mercurial" was released in 2021 and was signifying the new era for EaS . The album's concept is using the alchemical process as a metaphor for a psychological investigation. The record is featuring vocals in every song and was created in close collaboration with musical and film producer Alexander Perfilyev.

Discography 

 Comma (EP, 2012)
 Ouroboros (EP, 2013)
 V (Five) (LP, 2014)
 Monodrama (LP, 2017)
 Mercurial (LP, 2021)

Personnel 

 Fedor Kivokurtsev - songwriting, guitar, vocals, keyboards
 Alexey Zaytsev - bass  - albums "Comma(2012)", "Ouroboros(2013)", "V(2014)", "Monodrama(2017)", "Mercruial(2021)"
 Yaroslav Egorov - drums  - albums "V(2014)", "Monodrama(2017)" 
 Vladimir Pozdyshev - drums  - albums "Comma(2012)", "Ouroboros(2013)" 
 Leo Margarit - drums  - album "Mercurial(2021)"  
 Mariana Semkina - vocals  - album "Monodrama(2017)"
 Valentin Berezin(Adaen) - vocals  - album "V(2014)" 
 Polina Kallerman - vocals  - single "Waves Are Coming Home(2015)"

References

External links 

 
 Echoes and Signals History & Discography at ProgStreaming.com

Russian post-rock groups
Russian progressive rock groups
Musical groups established in 2012
2012 establishments in Russia